Dam Ab-e Kashan (also Romanized as Dam Āb-e Kāshān; also known as Kāshān) is a village in Pian Rural District, in the Central District of Izeh County, Khuzestan Province, Iran. At the 2006 census, its population was 79, in 13 families.

References 

Populated places in Izeh County